Agnès Varda (born Arlette Varda; 30 May 1928 – 29 March 2019) was a Belgian-born French film director, screenwriter, photographer, and artist. Her pioneering work was central to the development of the widely influential French New Wave film movement of the 1950s and 1960s. Her films focused on achieving documentary realism, addressing women's issues, and other social commentary, with a distinctive experimental style.

Varda's work employed location shooting in an era when the limitations of sound technology made it easier and more common to film indoors, with constructed sets and painted backdrops of landscapes, rather than outdoors, on location. Her use of non-professional actors was also unconventional for 1950s French cinema. Varda's feature film debut was La Pointe Courte (1955), followed by Cléo from 5 to 7 (1962), one of her most notable narrative films, Vagabond (1985), and Kung Fu Master (1988). Varda was also known for her work as a documentarian with such works as Black Panthers (1968), The Gleaners and I (2000), The Beaches of Agnès (2008), Faces Places (2017), and her final film, Varda by Agnès (2019).

Director Martin Scorsese described Varda as "one of the Gods of Cinema". Among several other accolades, Varda received an Honorary Palme d'Or at the Cannes Film Festival, a Golden Lion at the Venice Film Festival, an Academy Honorary Award, and was nominated for the Academy Award for Best Documentary Feature. She was the first female director to be feted with an honorary Oscar.

Early life
Varda was born Arlette Varda on 30 May 1928 in Ixelles, Brussels, Belgium, to Christiane (née Pasquet) and Eugène Jean Varda, an engineer. Her mother was from Sète, France, and her father was a member of a family of Greek refugees from Asia Minor. She was the third of five children. Varda legally changed her first name to Agnès at age 18. During World War II, she lived on a boat in Sète with her family. Varda attended the Lycée et collège Victor-Duruy, and received a bachelor's degree in literature and psychology from the Sorbonne. She described her relocation to Paris as a "truly excruciating" one that gave her "a frightful memory of my arrival in this grey, inhumane, sad city." She did not get along with her fellow students and called classes at the Sorbonne "stupid, antiquated, abstract, [and] scandalously unsuited for the lofty needs one had at that age."

Photography career
Varda intended to become a museum curator, and studied art history at the École du Louvre, but decided to study photography at the Vaugirard School of Photography instead. She began her career as a still photographer before becoming one of the major voices of the Left Bank Cinema and the French New Wave. She maintained a fluid interrelationship between photographic and cinematic forms: "I take photographs or I make films. Or I put films in the photos, or photos in the films."

Varda discussed her beginnings with the medium of still photography: "I started earning a living from photography straight away, taking trivial photographs of families and weddings to make money. But I immediately wanted to make what I called 'compositions.' And it was with these that I had the impression I was doing something where I was asking questions with composition, form and meaning." In 1951, her friend Jean Vilar opened the Théâtre National Populaire and hired Varda as its official photographer. Before accepting her position there, she worked as a stage photographer for the Theatre Festival of Avignon. She worked at the Théâtre National Populaire for ten years from 1951 to 1961, during which time her reputation grew and she eventually obtained photo-journalist jobs throughout Europe.

Varda's still photography sometimes inspired her subsequent motion pictures. She recounted: "When I made my first film, La Pointe Courtewithout experience, without having been an assistant before, without having gone to film schoolI took photographs of everything I wanted to film, photographs that are almost models for the shots. And I started making films with the sole experience of photography, that's to say, where to place the camera, at what distance, with which lens and what lights?"

She later recalled another example:I made a film in 1982 called Ulysse, which is based on another photograph I took in 1954, one I'd made with the same bellows camera, and I started Ulysse with the words, 'I used to see the image upside down.' There's an image of a goat on the ground, like a fallen constellation, and that was the origin of the photograph. With those cameras, you'd frame the image upside down, so I saw Brassaï through the camera with his head at the bottom of the image.

In 2010, Varda joined the gallery Nathalie Obadia.

Filmmaking career
Varda's filmmaking career predates the French New Wave, but contains many elements specific to that movement. While working as a photographer, Varda became interested in making a film, although she stated that she knew little about the medium and had only seen around 20 films by the age of 25. She later said that she wrote her first screenplay "just the way a person writes his first book. When I'd finished writing it, I thought to myself: 'I'd like to shoot that script,' and so some friends and I formed a cooperative to make it." She found the filmmaking process difficult because it did not allow the same freedom as writing a novel; she said her approach was instinctive and feminine. In an interview with The Believer, Varda said that she wanted to make films that related to her time (in reference to La Pointe Courte), rather than focusing on traditions or classical standards.

La Pointe Courte (1954)

Varda liked photography but was interested in moving into film. After spending a few days filming the small French fishing town of La Pointe Courte for a terminally ill friend who could no longer visit on his own, Varda decided to shoot a feature film of her own. Thus, in 1954, Varda's first film, La Pointe Courte, about an unhappy couple working through their relationship in a small fishing town, was released. The film is a stylistic precursor to the French New Wave. At the time, Varda was influenced by the philosophy of Gaston Bachelard, under whom she had once studied at the Sorbonne. "She was particularly interested in his theory of 'l'imagination des matières,' in which certain personality traits were found to correspond to concrete elements in a kind of psychoanalysis of the material world." This idea finds expression in La Pointe Courte as the characters' personality traits clash, shown through the opposition of objects such as wood and steel. To further her interest in character abstraction, Varda used two professional actors, Silvia Monfort and Philippe Noiret, combined with the residents of La Pointe Courte, to provide a realistic element that lends itself to a documentary aesthetic inspired by neorealism. Varda continued to use this combination of fictional and documentary elements in her films.

The film was edited by Varda's friend and fellow "Left Bank" filmmaker Alain Resnais, who was reluctant to work on it because it was "so nearly the film he wanted to make himself" and its structure was very similar to his own Hiroshima mon amour (1959). While editing the film in Varda's apartment, Resnais kept annoying her by comparing the film to works by Luchino Visconti, Michelangelo Antonioni and others that she was unfamiliar with "until I got so fed up with it all that I went along to the Cinémathèque to find out what he was talking about." Resnais and Varda remained lifelong friends, though Resnais said they had nothing in common "apart from cats." The film was immediately praised by Cahiers du Cinéma: André Bazin said, "There is a total freedom to the style, which produces the impression, so rare in the cinema, that we are in the presence of a work that obeys only the dreams and desires of its auteur with no other external obligations." François Truffaut called it "an experimental work, ambitious, honest and intelligent." Varda said that the film "hit like a cannonball because I was a young woman, since before that, in order to become a director you had to spend years as an assistant." But the film was a financial failure, and Varda made only short films for the next seven years.

Varda is considered the grandmother and mother of the French New Wave. La Pointe Courte is unofficially but widely considered the first film of the movement. It was the first of many she made that focus on issues ordinary people face. Late in her life, she said that she was not interested in accounts of people in power but "much more interested in the rebels, the people who fight for their own life".

Cléo from 5 to 7 (1961)

After La Pointe Courte, Varda made several documentary short films; two were commissioned by the French tourist office. These include one of Varda's favorites of her own works, L'opéra-mouffe, a film about the Rue Mouffetard street market which won an award at the 1958 Brussels Experimental Film Festival.

Cléo from 5 to 7 follows a pop singer through two extraordinary hours in which she awaits the results of a recent biopsy. The film is superficially about a woman coming to terms with her mortality, a common trope for Varda. On a deeper level, Cléo from 5 to 7 confronts the traditionally objectified woman by giving Cléo her own vision. She cannot be constructed through the gaze of others, which is often represented through a motif of reflections and Cléo's ability to strip her body of "to-be-looked-at" attributes (such as clothing or wigs). Stylistically, Cléo from 5 to 7 mixes documentary and fiction, as had La Pointe Courte. The film represents diegetic action said to occur between 5 and 7 p.m., although its run-time is 89 minutes.

Ciné-Tamaris (1977) 
In 1977, Varda founded her own production company, Ciné-Tamaris, in order to have more control over shooting and editing. In 2013, the Los Angeles County Museum of Art held Varda's first American exhibition, Agnès Varda in Californialand. It featured a sculptural installation, several photographs, and short films, and was inspired by time she spent in Los Angeles in the 1960s.

Vagabond (1985)

In 1985, Varda made Sans toit ni loi ("without roof nor law"; known in most English-speaking countries as Vagabond), a drama about the death of a young female drifter named Mona. The death is investigated by an unseen and unheard interviewer who focuses on the people who last saw her. Vagabond is told through nonlinear techniques, with the film divided into 47 episodes, and each episode about Mona told from a different person's perspective. Vagabond is considered one of Varda's greater feminist works because of how the film deals with the de-fetishization of the female body from the male perspective.

Jacquot de Nantes (1991)

In 1991, shortly after her husband Jacques Demy's death, Varda created the film Jacquot de Nantes, which is about his life and death. The film is structured at first as being a recreation of his early life, being obsessed with the various crafts used for filmmaking like animation and set design. But then Varda provides elements of documentary by inserting clips of Demy's films as well as footage of him dying. The film continues with Varda's common theme of accepting death, but at its heart it is considered to be Varda's tribute to her late husband and their work.

The Gleaners and I (2000)

Les Glaneurs et la Glaneuse (The Gleaners and I), a documentary, focuses on Varda's interactions with gleaners (harvesters) who live in the French countryside, and also includes subjects who create art through recycled material, as well as an interview with psychoanalyst Jean Laplanche. The film is notable for its fragmented and free-form nature along with it being the first time Varda used digital cameras. This style of filmmaking is often interpreted as a statement that great things like art can still be created through scraps, yet modern economies encourage people to only use the finest product.

Faces Places (2017)
In 2017, Varda co-directed Faces Places with the artist JR. The film was screened out of competition at the 2017 Cannes Film Festival where it won the L'Œil d'or award. The film follows Varda and JR traveling around rural France, creating portraits of the people they come across. Varda was nominated for the Academy Award for Best Documentary Feature for this film, making her the oldest person to be nominated for a competitive Oscar. Although the nomination was her first, Varda did not regard it as important, stating: "There is nothing to be proud of, but happy. Happy because we make films to love. We make films so that you love the film." The film ends with Varda and JR knocking on Jean-Luc Godard's front door in Rolle for an interview. Godard agreed to the meeting but "stands them up".

Style and influences
Many of Varda's films use protagonists that are marginalized or rejected members of society, and are documentary in nature. She made a short film on the Black Panthers after seeing that their leader, Huey Newton, was arrested for killing a policeman. The film focuses on demonstrations in support of Newton and the "Free Huey" campaign.

Like many other French New Wave directors, Varda was likely influenced by auteur theory, creating her own signature style by using the camera "as a pen." Varda called her method of filmmaking "cinécriture" ("cinematic writing" or "writing on film"). Rather than separating the fundamental roles that contribute to a film (such as cinematographer, screenwriter, and director), she believed that all roles should work together simultaneously to create a more cohesive film, and all elements of the film should contribute to its message. She claimed to make most of her discoveries while editing, seeking the opportunity to find images or dialogue that create a motif.

Because of her photographic background, still images are often significant in her films. They may serve symbolic or narrative purposes, and each element of them is important. There is sometimes conflict between still and moving images in her films, and she often mixed still images (snapshots) with moving images. Varda paid very close attention to detail and was highly conscious of the implications of each cinematic choice she made. Elements of the film are rarely just functional, each element has its own implications, both on its own and that it lends to the entire film's message.

Many of her influences were artistic or literary, including Surrealism, William Faulkner, Franz Kafka, and Nathalie Sarraute.

Involvement in French New Wave 
Because of her literary influences, and because her work predates the French New Wave, Varda's films belong more precisely to the Left Bank (Rive Gauche) cinema movement, along with those of Resnais, Chris Marker, Marguerite Duras, Alain Robbe-Grillet, Jean Cayrol and Henri Colpi. Categorically, the Left Bank side of the New Wave movement embraced a more experimental style than the Cahiers du Cinéma group, but this distinction is ironic considering that the New Wave itself was considered experimental in its treatment of traditional methodologies and subjects.

Left Bank Cinema was strongly tied to the nouveau roman movement in literature. The members of the group had in common a background in documentary filmmaking, left-wing politics, and a heightened interest in experimentation and the treatment of film as art. Varda and other Left Bank filmmakers crafted a mode of filmmaking that blends one of film's most socially motivated approaches, documentary, with one of its most formally experimental approaches, the avant-garde. Its members often collaborated with each other. According to scholar Delphine Bénézet, Varda resisted the "norms of representation and diktats of production."

As a feminist filmmaker
Varda's work is often considered feminist because of her use of female protagonists and her creation of a female cinematic voice. She said, "I'm not at all a theoretician of feminism. I did all that—my photos, my craft, my film, my life—on my terms, my own terms, and not to do it like a man." Although not actively involved in any strict agendas of the feminist movement, Varda often focused on women's issues thematically and never tried to change her craft to make it more conventional or masculine. She was also Professor of Film at The European Graduate School.

Bénézet has argued for Varda's importance as "au feminin singulier," a woman of singularity and of the utmost importance in film history. Varda embraced her femininity with distinct boldness.

Personal life and death
In 1958, while living in Paris, Varda met her future husband, Jacques Demy, also a French director. They moved in together in 1959. She was married to Demy from 1962 until his death in 1990. Varda had two children: a daughter, Rosalie Varda (born 1958), from a previous union with actor Antoine Bourseiller (who starred in Cléo from 5 to 7), and a son, Mathieu Demy (born 1972), with Demy. Demy legally adopted Rosalie Varda. Varda worked on the Oscar-nominated documentary Faces Places with her daughter.

In 1971, Varda was one of the 343 women who signed the Manifesto of the 343 admitting they had had an abortion despite it being illegal in France at the time and asking that abortion be made legal.

Varda was the cousin of the painter Jean Varda. In 1967, while living in California, Varda met her father's cousin for the first time. He is the subject of her short documentary Uncle Yanco. Jean Varda called himself "Yanco" and was affectionately called "uncle" by Varda due to their age difference.

Varda died from cancer on 29 March 2019 in Paris, at the age of 90. She was buried at Montparnasse Cemetery on 2 April. Among those who attended her funeral were Catherine Deneuve, Julie Gayet, Jean-Pierre Léaud, Jane Birkin, and Sandrine Bonnaire. Mourners left flowers and potatoes outside her house on rue Daguerre.

Her death drew a passionate response from the filmmaking community with Martin Scorsese releasing a statement writing, "I seriously doubt that Agnès Varda ever followed in anyone else’s footsteps, in any corner of her life or her art. Every single one of her remarkable handmade pictures, so beautifully balanced between documentary and fiction, is like no one else’s—every image, every cut … What a body of work she left behind: movies big and small, playful and tough, generous and solitary, lyrical and unflinching … and alive." Barry Jenkins tweeted, "Work and life were undeniably fused for this legend. She lived FULLY for every moment of those 90 damn years". Ava DuVernay wrote about her relationship with Varda, ending her statement with "Merci, Agnes. For your films. For your passion. For your light. It shines on." Other filmmakers and artists who paid tribute to Varda include Guillermo del Toro, the Safdie brothers, Edgar Wright, JR and Madonna. Jean-Luc Godard sent Varda's daughter Rosalie (who produced Faces Places) "a kind of photo collage of Agnés...It was something special. It's a secret. But he sent me something nice. I think he cared for Agnès a lot. He saw all her films", she said.

Awards and honors

Varda was a member of the jury at the Cannes Film Festival in 2005 and a member of the jury at the Venice Film Festival in 1983. In 2002 she was the recipient of the French Academy prize, René Clair Award. On 4 March 2007, she was appointed a Grand Officer of the National Order of Merit of France. On 12 April 2009, she was made Commandeur de la Légion d'honneur. In May 2010 Varda received the Directors' Fortnight's 8th Carosse d'Or award for lifetime achievement at the Cannes Film Festival. On 22 September 2010, Varda received an honorary degree from University of Liège, Belgium. On 14 May 2013, Varda was promoted to Grand Cross of the National Order of Merit of France. On 22 May 2013, Varda received the 2013 FIAF Award for her work in the field of film preservation and restoration. On 10 August 2014, Varda received the Leopard of Honour award at the 67th Locarno Film Festival. She was the second female to receive the award after Kira Muratova. On 13 December 2014, Varda received the honorary Lifetime Achievement Award, presented by the European Film Academy. On 24 May 2015, Varda received an honorary Palme d'Or. She was the first woman to receive an honorary Palme d'Or. On 16 April 2017, Varda was promoted to Grand officier de la Légion d'honneur. Varda was included in Cinema Eye's 2017 list of "Unforgettables."

On 11 November 2017, Varda received an Academy Honorary Award for her contributions to cinema, making her the first female director to receive such an award. The prize was presented at the 9th Annual Governors Awards ceremony. She was nominated two months later for the Academy Award for Best Documentary Feature for her documentary Faces Places, becoming the oldest nominated person at the show (she was eight days older than fellow nominee James Ivory).

For the 1985 documentary-style feature film Vagabond, she received the Golden Lion of the 42nd Venice International Film Festival. In 2009, The Beaches of Agnès won the Best Documentary Film award at the 34th César Awards.

At the time of her death, Varda was the oldest person to be nominated for an Academy Honorary Award and is the first female director to receive an honorary Oscar. In 2017, she was awarded the Honorary Academy Award which was presented to her by Angelina Jolie at the Governors Awards.

In 2019, the BBC polled 368 film experts from 84 countries to name the 100 best films by women directors. Varda was the most-named director, with six different films on the list: The Beaches of Agnès, One Sings, the Other Doesn't, The Gleaners and I, Le Bonheur, Vagabond, and the number-two entry on the list, Cléo from 5 to 7.

Retrospectives
Agnès Varda at Bildmuseet, Umeå University, Sweden. June 2, 2013 – August 18, 2013. 

Varda: A Retrospective at the Lincoln Center, New York, December 20, 2019 – January 6, 2020.

Filmography

Feature films

Short films

Television work

Publications
(All in French.)

Les Plages d'Agnès: texte illustré du film d'Agnès Varda, collection Mémoires de César, éditions de l'Œil, 108 pp. (2010)  
L'île et elle: Agnès Varda, Actes sud, 81 pp. (2006)  
Sans toit ni loi: un film d'Agnès Varda, L'Avant-scène Cinéma, 92 pp. (2003) 
Varda par Agnès, Les Cahiers du Cinéma  (1994, reprint 2005)  
La Côte d'Azur, d'azur, d'azur, d'azur, collection Lieu-dit, Les éditions du Temps (1961)

References

Further reading

DeRoo, Rebecca J. (2018). Agnes Varda between Film, Photography, and Art. University of California Press. .
Joanna Bruzdowicz et al. Sight and Sound; June 2019, pp. 12–13: "Agnès Varda, 1928-2019"

External links

Agnès Varda at Ciné Tamaris

1928 births
2019 deaths
Academy Honorary Award recipients
César Honorary Award recipients
Directors of Golden Lion winners
Belgian emigrants to France
Belgian people of Greek descent
Photographers from Brussels
Commandeurs of the Légion d'honneur
Deaths from breast cancer
Deaths from cancer in France
École du Louvre alumni
Academic staff of European Graduate School
French cinematographers
French feminists
French film editors
French film producers
French people of Greek descent
French photographers
French screenwriters
French women cinematographers
French women film directors
French women photographers
French women screenwriters
People from Ixelles
French women film editors
Burials at Montparnasse Cemetery
French women film producers
Signatories of the 1971 Manifesto of the 343